FC Bayern Munich is a German women's football team based in Munich, Bavaria. It currently plays in the Frauen-Bundesliga, the top women's league in Germany.

History
Bayern's women's football team was officially founded in 1970 although women had been playing at the club since 1967. However, because the DFB had outlawed women's football from 1955 to 1970 Bayern could only officially register the team in 1970. They won their first national championship in 1976. In 1990 Bayern were founding members of the Frauen-Bundesliga, but they were relegated after next season.

The club returned to the Bundesliga in 2000. In 2009, Bayern were runners-up in the Bundesliga, trailing champion Turbine Potsdam by a single goal. In the 2011–12 season on 12 May 2012, FC Bayern Munich dethroned the German Cup title holders 1. FFC Frankfurt with a 2–0 in the 2011–12 final in Cologne and celebrated the biggest success of the club's history since winning the championship in 1976. In 2015 they won the Bundesliga for the first time, without any defeat. They won the 2015–16 Bundesliga, for the second time in a row.

Players

First-team squad

Out on loan

Reserves
Bayern II, the women's reserves team, have played in the newly formed 2. Frauen-Bundesliga since 2018. They are managed by Nathalie Bischof.

Bayern II won the 2008–09 Regionalliga (Süd) and the 2001–02 Bavarian Cup. The team played in the Second Bundesliga (Süd) from 2009 to 2010 to 2018.

Honours

Domestic
Frauen-Bundesliga (4): 1976, 2014–15, 2015–16, 2020–21
DFB-Pokal (1): 2012
Bundesliga Cup (2): 2003, 2011

Regional
Bavarian women's football championship (21): 1972–1990 (19 consecutive), 2000, 2004
Bavarian cup: 1982, 1984, 1985, 1986, 1987, 1988, 1989, 1990

Invitational
Valais Cup: 2015

Record in UEFA Women's Champions League
Bayern Munich have set a few international records in their campaign to qualify for the 2009–10 UEFA Women's Champions League:
Most goals scored throughout an UEFA Women's Champions League group stage: 32 (2009–10)
Best goal difference throughout an UEFA Women's Champions League group stage: +30 (2009–10)
All results (away, home and aggregate) list Bayern Munich's goal tally first.

f First leg.

Coaching staff

References

External links

Women's section
Women's football clubs in Germany
Football clubs in Bavaria
Association football clubs established in 1970
1970 establishments in West Germany
Frauen-Bundesliga clubs
Women in Munich